Ada Supermarket is an Indonesian supermarket based in Semarang, Central Java, and owned by PT Ada Perkasa Sahitaguna. Ada Swalayan sells a variety of household needs, clothing, shoes and toys, and some outlets have a food court.

See also 
Giant Hypermarket
Lotte Mart

Supermarkets of Indonesia